Pirogovsky was an urban locality (a work settlement) in Mytishchinsky District, Moscow Oblast, Russia. On 16 November 2015, it was merged into the city of Mytishchi. Population:

References

2015 disestablishments in Russia
Populated places disestablished in 2015
Former populated places in Moscow Oblast